This list comprises all players who have participated in at least one league match for Minnesota Stars FC (formally NSC Minnesota Stars) in the USSF D2 Pro League in 2010 or in the North American Soccer League from 2011 to 2016. Players who were on the roster but never played a first team game are not listed; players who appeared for the team in other competitions (U.S. Open Cup, CONCACAF Champions League, etc.) but never actually made an USL appearance are noted at the bottom of the page where appropriate.

A "†" denotes players who only appeared in a single match.

A
  Ely Allen
  Kyle Altman
  Bernardo Añor
  Andres Arango

B
  J. C. Banks
  Jack Blake
  Simone Bracalello
  Jeb Brovsky
  Edi Buro

C
  Tiago Calvano
  Pablo Campos
  Steward Ceus
  Shawn Chin
  Chris Clements
  Jeff Cosgriff
  Louis Crayton †
  Danny Cruz
  Brian Cvilikas

D
  Justin Davis
  Devin Del Do
  Cristiano Dias

F
  Kevin Friedland

G
  Gao Leilei
  Sandy Gbandi
  John Gilkerson
  Andrei Gotsmanov
  Thomas Granum 
  Two-Boys Gumede

H
  Anthony Hamilton
  Mitch Hildebrandt
  Neil Hlavaty

I
  Miguel Ibarra
  Fuad Ibrahim
  Ibson

J
  Ismaila Jome

K
  Brian Kallman

L
  Lance Laing
  Andy Lorei
  Scott Lorenz
  Damion Lowe

M
  Daniel Mendes
  Johnny Menyongar
  Yago Moreira Silva
  Geison Moura
  Luke Mulholland

N
  Sammy Ndjock
  Martin Nuñez
  Tino Nuñez

P
  Stefano Pinho
  Aaron Pitchkolan
  Nate Polak

R
  Christian Ramirez
  Michael Reed
  Lucas Rodríguez

S
  Evan Sassano
  Ben Speas
  Jonny Steele
  Jack Stewart

T
  Kentaro Takada
  Melvin Tarley
  Ernest Tchoupe
  Connor Tobin

U
  Warren Ukah

V
  Matt Van Oekel
  Kevin Venegas
  Juliano Vicentini

W
  Amani Walker
  Travis Wall
  Joe Warren
  Daniel Wasson
  Jamie Watson
  Ryan Woods
  Leland Wright

Sources

Minnesota Stars FC
 
Association football player non-biographical articles